This is a list of high schools in Oakland, California.

American Indian Public High School, a charter school
Aspire Lionel Wilson College Preparatory Academy, a charter school
Aspire Golden State College Preparatory Academy, a (6-12) charter school
Bishop O'Dowd High School
Bunche High School (alternate continuation)
Castlemont High School/Castlemont Community of Small Schools
Coliseum College Prep Academy (6–12)
The College Preparatory School
Dewey Academy High School (alternate continuation)
Far West High School
Fremont High School
Head Royce School
Lighthouse Community Public School
Life Academy of Health and Bioscience
Madison Park Academy 6-12
McClymonds High School
MetWest High School
Oakland Charter High School
Oakland Technical High School
Oakland Technical High Engineering Academy
Oakland High School
Oakland International High School
Oakland School of the Arts
Patten Academy
Rudsdale High School (alternate continuation)
Skyline High School
Street Academy (alternate)

Former schools
Merritt Middle College High School (alternative education/middle college), closed in 2007
Oakland Aviation High School, a charter school, opened in 2005, closed in 2011
Roosevelt High School, now Roosevelt Middle School
University Preparatory Charter Academy, a charter school, opened in 2001, closed in 2007
Youth Empowerment School (YES), a small public school that emerged from Fremont in 2004 and moved to the old King Estates Middle School campus after it was closed in 2011

See also
List of Oakland, California elementary schools
List of Oakland, California middle schools

References

 
Oakland high schools
High schools